Nilesh Bhatt (born March 17, 1971) is the Chief Executive Officer and chairman of Pilipili  Entertainment Company Limited based in Dar es Salaam, Tanzania. He is widely regarded as the most influential film executive in the East African film and movie industry, he is responsible for guiding the overall activities of the second largest film company in East Africa.

Personal life

Mr. Nilesh is married and has 2 children, a son named Kush Bhatt and a daughter Paridhi Bhatt. He lives with the family in Dar es Salaam, Tanzania.

Early life

A graduate of Bhavan's College, Mumbai University, Mr. Nilesh joined African Pride Textile Mills Ltd, a family business in 1997 as the Chief Executive officer. Under Mr. Nilesh's leadership, APTML became the industry's most successful textile company in East Africa, leading the industry in market share for 8 consecutive years. During that time, he oversaw APTML's rapid evolution from a junior company into a full-fledged textile company.

Pilipili Entertainment

In 2006, Mr. Nilesh, along with his childhood friend Mr. Sameer Srivastava founded Pilipili Entertainment, which became among the most successful film companies in East and Central Africa. While leading Pilipili Entertainment, Mr. Nilesh energized the company by attracting and recruiting many of the Film Industry's most talented executives. With the acquisition of world-class equipment, Mr. Nilesh was directly involved with the restructuring and integration process to create East Africa's largest film company. Under his leadership, he has produced TV commercials, hundreds of movies and organized numerous big events.

Throughout his career, Mr. Nilesh has worked in many different capacities with some of the most popular and influential Africa's and Bollywood's Artists, Actors, Producers, and Directors of the past four decades, including Steven Kanumba, Mzee Chillo, Jackline Wolper, Jacob Steven and Rose Ndauka. Recently in the year 2019 his company Pilipili Entertainment Company Launched an entertainment pay tv channel "Mambo Tv - Swahili". The channel has been successful since then and is on the DTH and DTT platforms of Startimes and Zuku.Pilipili Entertainment also launched his music arm Pilipili Music Mania which manages the new aspiring and also well-known singers. Richi Mavoko is one of them.Just recently on June 14, 2021 launched a second entertainment channel "Mambo Moto" in Swahili language for the audiences of East Africa.

References

1971 births
Living people